Unni Larsen (born 23 March 1959) is a Norwegian former racing cyclist and dogsled racer. She participated at the 1984 Summer Olympics in Los Angeles where she placed fourth. She has fifteen victories in various Norwegian cycling championships, and is also Scandinavian champion in road racing. She is national champion in dogsled racing from 1984.

References

External links

1959 births
Living people
Cyclists from Oslo
Cyclists at the 1984 Summer Olympics
Cyclists at the 1988 Summer Olympics
Olympic cyclists of Norway
Norwegian female cyclists
Norwegian dog mushers